This article documents the chronology and epidemiology of SARS-CoV-2, the virus that causes the coronavirus disease 2019 (COVID-19) and is responsible for the COVID-19 pandemic, in March 2023. The first human cases of COVID-19 were identified in Wuhan, China in December 2019.

Case statistics

Pandemic chronology

1 March 
WHO Weekly Report:
Malaysia has reported 217 new cases, bringing the total number to 5,043,008. There are 233 recoveries, bringing the total number of recoveries to 4,996,818. There are two deaths, bringing the death toll to 36,960.
Taiwan has reported 12,212 new cases, bringing the total number to 10,055,439. 27 new deaths were reported, bringing the death toll to 17,975.

2 March 
Malaysia has reported 244 new cases, bringing the total number to 5,043,252. There are 213 recoveries, bringing the total number of recoveries to 4,997,031. There are five deaths, bringing the death toll to 36,965.
Taiwan has reported 12,032 new cases, bringing the total number to 10,069,539. 43 new deaths were reported, bringing the death toll to 18,010.

3 March 
Malaysia has reported 204 new cases, bringing the total number to 5,043,456. There are 213 recoveries, bringing the total number of recoveries to 4,997,244. The death toll remains 36,965.
Taiwan has reported 13,813 new cases, bringing the total number to 10,083,351. 62 new deaths were reported, bringing the death toll to 18,072.

4 March 
Malaysia has reported 170 new cases, bringing the total number to 5,043,626. There are 178 recoveries, bringing the total number of recoveries to 4,997,422. The death toll remains 36,965.
Taiwan has reported 11,397 new cases, bringing the total number to 10,094,733. 71 new deaths were reported, bringing the death toll to 18,143.

5 March 
Malaysia has reported 164 new cases, bringing the total number to 5,043,790. There are 198 recoveries, bringing the total number of recoveries to 4,997,620. One death was reported, bringing the death toll to 36,966.
Taiwan has reported 10,307 new cases, bringing the total number to 10,105,039. 60 new deaths were reported, bringing the death toll to 18,203.

6 March 
Malaysia has reported 188 new cases, bringing the total number to 5,043,978. There are 181 recoveries, bringing the total number of recoveries to 4,997,801. The death toll remains 36,966.
New Zealand has reported 11,453 new cases over the past week, bringing the total number to 2,228,291. There are 8,962 recoveries, bringing the total number of recoveries to 2,214,316. There are six deaths, bringing the death toll to 2,548.
Taiwan has reported 7,080 new cases, bringing the total number to 10,112,117. 45 new deaths were reported, bringing the death toll to 18,248.

7 March 
Malaysia has reported 226 new cases, bringing the total number to 5,044,204. There are 202 recoveries, bringing the total number of recoveries to 4,998,003. The death toll remains 36,966.
Taiwan has reported 11,038 new cases, bringing the total number to 10,123,157. 34 new deaths were reported, bringing the death toll to 18,282.

8 March 
WHO Weekly Report:
Malaysia has reported 235 new cases, bringing the total number to 5,044,439. There are 216 recoveries, bringing the total number of recoveries to 4,998,219. There was one death, bringing the death toll to 36,967.
Taiwan has reported 11,060 new cases, bringing the total number to 10,134,211. 40 new deaths were reported, bringing the death toll to 18,322.
California governor Gavin Newsom has tested positive for COVID-19 for the second time.

9 March 
Malaysia has reported 279 new cases, bringing the total number to 5,044,718. There are 236 recoveries, bringing the total number of recoveries to 4,998,455. The death toll remains 36,967.
Taiwan has reported 9,584 new cases, bringing the total number to 10,143,788. 49 new deaths were reported, bringing the death toll to 18,371.

10 March 
Malaysia has reported 251 new cases, bringing the total number to 5,044,969. There are 197 recoveries, bringing the total number of recoveries to 4,998,652. The death toll remains 36,967.
Taiwan has reported 9,098 new cases, bringing the total number to 10,152,881. 54 new deaths were reported, bringing the death toll to 18,425.

11 March 
Malaysia has reported 223 new cases, bringing the total number to 5,045,192. There are 193 recoveries, bringing the total number of recoveries to 4,998,845. The death toll remains 36,967.
Taiwan has reported 8,618 new cases, bringing the total number to 10,161,496. 48 new deaths were reported, bringing the death toll to 18,473.

12 March 
Taiwan has reported 9,093 new cases, bringing the total number to 10,170,589. 39 new deaths were reported, bringing the death toll to 18,512.

13 March
New Zealand has reported 11,544 new cases over the past week, bringing the total number to 2,239,800. There are 11,417 recoveries, bringing the total number of recoveries to 2,225,733. There are 12 deaths, bringing the death toll to 2,560.
Taiwan has reported 6,435 new cases, bringing the total number to 10,177,165. 37 new deaths were reported, bringing the death toll to 18,549.

14 March
Taiwan has reported 9,860 new cases, bringing the total number to 10,187,238. 28 new deaths were reported, bringing the death toll to 18,577.

15 March
Taiwan has reported 10,188 new cases, bringing the total number to 10,197,421. 42 new deaths were reported, bringing the death toll to 18,619.

16 March
WHO Weekly Report:
Taiwan has reported 9,062 new cases, bringing the total number to 10,206,482. 37 new deaths were reported, bringing the death toll to 18,656.

17 March
Taiwan has reported 8,416 new cases, bringing the total number to 10,214,788. 41 new deaths were reported, bringing the death toll to 18,697.

18 March
Taiwan has reported 8,026 new cases, bringing the total number to 10,222,922. 35 new deaths were reported, bringing the death toll to 18,732.

19 March
Austria surpasses 6 million COVID-19 cases.
Taiwan has reported 8,419 new cases, bringing the total number to 10,231,343. 43 new deaths were reported, bringing the death toll to 18,775.

20 March
New Zealand has reported 11,171 new cases over the past week, bringing the total number of cases to 2,250,952. There are 11,483 recoveries, bringing the total number of recoveries to 2,237,216. There are 26 deaths, bringing the death toll to 2,586.
Taiwan has reported 5,544 new cases, bringing the total number to 10,236,887. 28 new deaths were reported, bringing the death toll to 18,803.

Summary 
 Asia 
 

 Antarctica 
 
 

 Overseas 
 
 
  Prince Edward Islands

See also 
 Timeline of the COVID-19 pandemic

References 

March 2023 events
Timelines of the COVID-19 pandemic in 2023
Timelines of current events